Events in the year 2014 in Eritrea.

Incumbents 

 President: Isaias Afewerki

Events 

 16 – 28 August – The country competed at the 2014 Summer Youth Olympics, in Nanjing, China.

Deaths

References 

 
2010s in Eritrea
Years of the 21st century in Eritrea
Eritrea
Eritrea